Emma Marris (born January 15, 1979) is an American non-fiction writer. She grew up in Seattle, Washington, and attended Roosevelt High School, where she worked on the school newspaper. She earned a BA in English at the University of Texas at Austin and a Masters in Science Writing from Johns Hopkins University, and wrote for the scientific journal Nature for five years. Her book Rambunctious Garden: Saving Nature in a Post-Wild World introduces conservation approaches that go beyond simply protecting land seen as "wilderness." Her 2021 book, Wild Souls: Freedom and Flourishing in the Non-Human World, focuses on the ethics of human relationships with wild animals, including hunting, keeping wild pets, captive breeding, and wildlife management. Marris proposes a unified ethical approach that balances the protection of biodiversity with respect for the welfare and autonomy of nonhuman animals. Her TED talks have been watched over 3 million times. Her articles appear in outlets including National Geographic, Outside, the Atavist, Wired, High Country News, the Atlantic, and the New York Times.

References

External links

1979 births
Living people
American non-fiction environmental writers
Women science writers
21st-century American non-fiction writers
21st-century American women writers
American nature writers
American women non-fiction writers
Writers from Seattle
University of Texas at Austin alumni
Johns Hopkins University alumni